Esther Yang (born Yang Yung-tsun) is a Taiwanese actress.

Filmography

Television series

References

External links

 
 

1987 births
21st-century Taiwanese actresses
Actresses from Taipei
Living people